Albrecht Manegold (born 1973) is a German ornithologist and paleontologist. He is the curator of the vertebrate collection at the State Museum of Natural History Karlsruhe. He is known for contributions to the study of early passerine evolution. He has described extinct passerines and piciformes including the fossil treecreeper Certhia rummeli and the fossil woodpecker Australopicus nelsonmandelai.

Education and career 
Manegold studied biology at the Free University of Berlin. He completed his PhD thesis in 2005, on the phylogeny and evolution of the Coraciiformes (kinfishers, bee-eaters and allies), Piciformes (woodpeckers and allies), and Passeriformes (perching birds). He worked at Senckenberg Research Institute. He is presently the curator of the vertebrate collection of the State Museum of Natural History Karlsruhe, with research focus on fossil birds of the Maghreb and South Africa and paleornithological reconstruction. 

Manegold described the extinct treecreeper Certhia rummeli from a fossilized right tarsometatarsus found in karstic fissure fillings in Petersbuch, Bavaria. The fossil woodpecker Australopicus nelsonmandelai, found at the Langebaanweg fossil site in South Africa, and representing the oldest known woodpecker in Africa, was described and named by Manegold for South African president Nelson Mandela's 94th birthday.

Awards 

 2007: Bernhard Rensch Prize for his dissertation work on phylogeny and evolution of Coraciiformes, Piciformes, and Passeriformes.
 2008: Maria Koepcke Prize for his work in creating a new classification system of passerine birds based on morphological characteristics in bone structure, clarifying relationships within living birds and allowing for assignment of extinct representatives of extant families.

Selected publications 

 Manegold A. (2020). New results on birds from the Early Pleistocene site of Untermassfeld. In: 
 
 
 
 
 Manegold A., Louchart A., Carrier J. & Elzanowski A. (2013). The Early Pliocene avifauna of Langebaanweg (South Africa): a review and update. In: Göhlich, U.B., Kroh, A. (eds.) Paleornithological Research 2013 – Proceedings of the 8th International Meeting of the Society of Avian Paleontology and Evolution: 135–152.
 Manegold A., Podsiadlowski L. (2013). Erste morphologische und molekulare Untersuchungen zur phylogenetischen Stellung des Grünköpfchens Agapornis swindernianus. Vogelwarte 51: 348.

References 

German ornithologists
German paleontologists
1973 births
Free University of Berlin alumni
21st-century German biologists
Living people